Lee Ford Tannehill (October 26, 1880 – February 16, 1938)  was a professional baseball player. He played all or part of ten seasons in Major League Baseball, from 1903 until 1912, for the Chicago White Sox, primarily as a third baseman and shortstop. He was the brother of the pitcher Jesse Tannehill. He was the first player to hit a home run in Comiskey Park.

See also
List of Major League Baseball players who spent their entire career with one franchise

Notes

External links 

Major League Baseball third basemen
Major League Baseball shortstops
Chicago White Sox players
Richmond Blue Birds players
Colorado Springs Millionaires players
Minneapolis Millers (baseball) players
Louisville Colonels (minor league) players
Kansas City Blues (baseball) players
Omaha Rourkes players
South Bend Benders players
Grand Rapids Black Sox players
Jacksonville Roses players
Dallas Giants players
Minor league baseball managers
Baseball players from Kentucky
1880 births
1938 deaths